Kurt E. Koch (born 16 November 1913 in Berghausen, Pfinztal; died 25 January 1987) was a Protestant theologian and writer. He was best known for his publications on the occult.

Life 
After studying Protestant theology, Koch obtained a doctorate in theology from the University of Tübingen. He then became a pastor at the service of the Protestant Church in Baden. His functions were mainly working with young people and evangelism.

In addition, Koch spent many years working as a missionary in Africa, in close collaboration with the humanitarian mission Kwasizabantu (KSB). In 1949, he founded a mission with the purpose of distributing the Bible and evangelistic writings around the world for free. The mission still exists today as a registered association in Schwäbisch Gmünd – Lindach as part of KSB. Over the following years, his missionary and evangelistic work led him to more than 100 countries, where he held lectures at universities, seminaries, Bible schools and many churches on every continent. He also worked as a journalist.

Writing and theology  
The main themes of his work and books were: the decision to live one's life for Christ, pastoral care in relation to the occult, information about demonic spirits, the various areas of revival of the earth, the work of the Holy Spirit and the return of Jesus.

Some of his books he published under the pseudonyms Klaus Becker, Carol Córnea, Peter Diestel, Kasimir Kucharski, Marc Marot, and René Monod.

Koch was convinced of the existence of witchcraft and black magic that competed in a fight against "the good" for terrestrial supremacy.

Publishing company 
Koch founded his own publishing company to distribute his writings. His publisher, Kwaziabantu, is today the leading distributor of his materials in Germany, and is run by his daughter.

Publications (selection) 
Jesus Heals, Evangelization Publishers, 5th edition 1962
Heinrich Coerper and his Work, Liebenzeller Mission, Bad Liebenzell/Württemberg 1964
The Revival in Indonesia, Evangelization Publishers, 1970 
Occult ABC, Bible and Scripture Mission Dr. Kurt E. Koch eV, 4th edition 1996
God among the Zulus, Herold -Verlag, Frankfurt am Main 1979
Christian Counseling and Occultism, 26th edition, Brunnen-Verlag, Basel/Gießen, 1985 
Possession and Exorcism,  1st edition, Bible and Mission Scriptures, 1992, 
The Devils Alphabet, First American Printing 1971, Kregel Publications,

Literature 
Helmuth Pfandl. With Jesus around the world to work in the life of Kurt E. Koch Evangelization Publishers, Laval Canada, 1983

See also 
Spiritual warfare

References

External links  

Internetpräsenz der Bibel- und Schriftenmission Dr. Kurt E. Koch e.V.
Internetpräsenz von seinem Freund Horst Koch mit vielen Texten von Kurt E. Koch

Protestant writers
20th-century Christian mystics
Protestant mystics
Spiritual warfare